The University of Hildesheim (in German Universität Hildesheim) is a public university located in Hildesheim.

History

Alfeld University of Education (Pädagogische Hochschule Alfeld) – University of Hildesheim 
The University of Hildesheim originated from the University of Education in  Alfeld established in 1946. Because of the massive destruction of the city of Hildesheim during the Second World War, the university has been relocated in Alfeld, which remained mostly intact. Under its director Hans Abmeier, 110 students were registered in the university in its first academic year in 1946/47, and approximately 50 students for several years after that. The aim of the university was to provide teachers for the Catholic population in the British zone, without religion being a necessary condition for admission. Hans-Otto Knackstedt, chaplain, taught Catholic theology, and Otto Brauckmann, musical director in cathedrals, taught music in the university. Under the director and Catholic philosopher Franz Flintrop, the Alfeld University of Education became independent from the Ministry of Education and finally, under rector Günter Klages, it was relocated back to Hildesheim in 1970 as a department of the University of Education of Lower Saxony (Pädagogische Hochschule Niedersachsen).
In 1978 the university became independent once again and was named as Scientific University of Hildesheim under rector Heinz-Wilhelm Alten. In 1989, it was renamed University of Hildesheim by the rector Reinhard Göllner. Ulla Bosse was its first president serving from 1998 until 2002.

Public Foundation University of Hildesheim (Stiftungsuniversität) 
On 1 January 2003, the sponsorship of the University of Hildesheim was transferred from the state of Lower Saxony to the public Foundation University of Hildesheim becoming one of the first public universities in Germany. Four other universities in Lower Saxony followed the lead of the University of Hildesheim at the same time, namely the Universities of Göttingen and Lüneburg, the University of Applied Sciences of Osnabrück and the University of Veterinary Medicine Hannover. The current president of the foundation is May-Britt Kallenrode.

The number of students in the University of Hildesheim reached 8.574 in the winter semester 2021/22. The Department of Education has the highest number of students in the University of Hildesheim, teaching approximately 3.200 students (from which about 19 percent come from different federal states), while the Department of Cultural Studies comes second teaching approximately 1.100 students (from which about 34 percent come from different federal states).

Female students make up about 69 percent of the student body in the university. Furthermore, the number of female professors reaches up to 40 percent exceeding the national average. Equality between women and men, as well as between people of different social, ethnic and religious backgrounds, is an important principle of the University of Hildesheim. Its equality concept was positively reviewed in both rounds of the third phase of the Program for Female Professors, initiated by the Federal Ministry of Education and Research (BMBF) and the other federal states (2008, 2013).

Rectors and Presidents

The following rectors and presidents were the Head of the University of Hildesheim:

Alfeld University of Education 1945–1969

 1945–1953: Johannes (Hans) Abmeier, rector
 1953–1956: Franz Pasternak, rector
 1956–1959: Hans-Otto Knackstedt, Head of the university
 1959–1962: Franz Flintrop, Head of the university
 1962–1966: Wilhelm Rückriem, Head, ab 1963 rector
 1966–1967: Werner Trillmich, rector
 1967–1969: Heinrich Maiworm, rector
 1969: Günther Klages, rector

Deans of the University of Education Lower Saxony- Department of Hildesheim 1969–1978

 1969–1971: Günter Klages
 1971–1973: Fro Trommsdorff
 1973–1976: Dieter Lüttge
 1976–1978: Heinz-Wilhelm Alten
 1978: Herbert Kraatz

Rectors of the Scientific University of Hildesheim 1978–1989

 1978–1979: Herbert Kraatz, appointed rector
 1979–1981: Heinz-Wilhelm Alten, mathematician, first elected rector of the Scientific University of Hildesheim
 1981–1983: Dieter Lüttge, psychologist, rector of the Scientific University of Hildesheim
 1983–1985: Theodor Kreutzkamp, mathematician, rector of the Scientific University of Hildesheim
 1985–1989: Reinhard Göllner, theologian, rector of the Scientific University of Hildesheim and first rector of the University of  Hildesheim

Rectors and presidents of the University of Hildesheim 1989–2002

 1989–1991: Ernst Cloer, educationalist, rector of the University of Hildesheim
 1991–1995: Rudolf Weber, musicologist, rector of the University of Hildesheim
 1995–1998: Wolfgang Menzel, German philologist and educator, rector of the University of Hildesheim
 1998–2002: Ulla Bosse, psychologist, first president of the University of Hildesheim
 2002–2003: Wolfgang-Uwe Friedrich, political scientist, president of the University of Hildesheim

Presidents of the public Foundation University of Hildesheim since 2003

 2003–2020: Wolfgang-Uwe Friedrich, political scientist, president of the public Foundation University of Hildesheim
 1 January 2021 – present: May-Britt Kallenrode, physicist, president of the public Foundation University of Hildesheim

Faculties and institutes 
The University of Hildesheim is organized into four departments, from which 27 institutes have been established.

Faculty 1: Educational and Social Sciences 

 Institute of Education Studies (Dept. of Applied Education Studies, Dept. of General Educational Studies)
 Institute of Elementary School Didactics and General Science
 Institute of Psychology
 Institute of Social Sciences
 Institute of Catholic Theology
 Institute of Protestant Theology
 Institute of History
 Institute of Social and Organizational Education
 Institute of Sport Science

Faculty 2: Cultural Studies and Aesthetic Communication 

 Institute of Cultural politics
 Institute of Philosophy
 Institute of literary Writing and literary Studies
 Institute of Media, Theatre and popular Culture
 Institute of Music and Musicology
 Institute of Visual Arts and Art science

Faculty 3: Linguistics and Information Science 

 Institute of German language and Literature
 Institute of English language and Literature
 Institute of intercultural Communication
 Institute of Translation Studies and Specialized Communication
 Institute of Information Studies and Language Technology

Faculty 4: Mathematics, Natural Sciences, Economics and Computer Science 

  Institute of Biology and Chemistry
 Institute of Geography
 Institute of Physics
 Institute of Engineering
 Institute of Mathematics and Applied Computer Sciences
 Institute of Computer Studies

Range of Studies

The four different departments of the University of Hildesheim provide many different courses of studies. The first department teaches psychology, educational science and social pedagogy and the courses mainly take place in the main campus. The second department is associated with cultural studies, creative writing and scenic arts and the courses take place on the cultural campus of Domäne Marienburg. The third department focuses on languages and communication. An example of this department is the study program "International Communication and Translation". Furthermore, the fourth department offers IT and environmental science courses. Teacher education for elementary, secondary and intermediate schools can be studied in all four departments and its range of studies includes 18 subjects. In total, the University of Hildesheim offers more than 40 Bachelor's and Master's programs, including the English-speaking Master's program "Data Analytics".

According to the winter semester 2021/22 student records, 69 percent of the total 8,574 students of the University of Hildesheim are female, a number exceeding significantly the national average for universities in Germany (52 percent). [11] 3.214 students are registered in the Department of Education, from which 2.188 students are female (68%).  The Department of Cultural studies comprises 13 percent of the total students of the University of Hildesheim, of which 819 are female. The IT department offering the study programs of "Applied Computer Science", "Data Analytics" and "Business Informatics" comprises 6 percent of the total students, with 505 students enrolled, of which 34 percent are women (171 female students). In 2021, 1.664 students graduated from the University of Hildesheim, and 50 doctoral programs were successfully completed.

Notable Professors

 Silvio Vietta (born 1941), literary scholar
 Hanns-Josef Ortheil (born 1951), author und Germanist
 Michael Gehler (born 1962), historian
 Joachim Friedmann (born 1966), dramaturg
 Kevin Kuhn (born 1981), author and literary theorist

See also
 List of colleges and universities
 Hildesheim

References

External links

  

Hildesheim
Hildesheim
Buildings and structures in Hildesheim
Educational institutions established in 1978
1978 establishments in Germany